Flat-panel displays are thin panels of glass or plastic used for electronically displaying text, images, or video. Liquid crystal displays (LCD), OLED (organic light emitting diode) and microLED displays are not quite the same; since LCD uses a liquid crystal that reacts to an electric current blocking light or allowing it to pass through the panel, whereas OLED/microLED displays consist of electroluminescent organic/inorganic materials that generate light when a current is passed through the material. LCD, OLED and microLED displays are driven using LTPS, IGZO, LTPO, and A-Si TFT transistor technologies as their backplane using ITO to supply current to the transistors and in turn to the liquid crystal or electroluminescent material. Segment and passive OLED and LCD displays do not use a backplane but use indium tin oxide (ITO), a transparent conductive material, to pass current to the electroluminescent material or liquid crystal. In LCDs, there is an even layer of liquid crystal throughout the panel whereas an OLED display has the electroluminescent material only where it is meant to light up. OLEDs, LCDs and microLEDs can be made flexible and transparent, but LCDs require a backlight because they cannot emit light on their own like OLEDs and microLEDs.

LCD panel manufacturers 

Liquid-crystal display (or LCD) is a thin, flat panel used for electronically displaying information such as text, images, and moving pictures. They are usually made of glass but they can also be made out of plastic. Some manufacturers make transparent LCD panels and special sequential color segment LCDs that have higher than usual refresh rates and an RGB backlight. The backlight is synchronized with the display so that the colors will show up as needed. The list of LCD manufacturers:

 AU Optronics
 BOE (bought Hydis)
 Casio (former)
 ChiMei former, merged with Innolux)
 Chunghwa Picture Tubes
 East Rising
 Epson
 Giantplus technology
 HannStar Display Corporation
 HEM
/ Microtips Technology
 Hitachi (former, merged with Japan Display alongside Sony and Toshiba)
 HKC
 InnoLux Corporation
 Japan Display
 Karson Ho -SHENZHEN GUOJIA
 Kyocera
 LG Display
 LXD Incorporated
 Maclight Display
 Mitsubishi Electric
 NEC Display Solutions (former, now Tianma)
 New Vision Display
 Newhaven Display
/ Orient Display
 PalmTech
 Panasonic Corporation (former)
 Pioneer
 Planar Systems (former)
 Powertip Technology Corporation
 Samsung Display (former, formerly / S-LCD, a then-joint venture between Samsung Electronics and Sony which Samsung Electronics subsequently bought out Sony's share)
/ Sakai display products (joint venture between Foxconn and Sharp Corporation)
 Sharp Corporation
 Sony (former, merged into Japan Display)
 TCL (as CSOT)
 Tianma
 Toshiba (former, merged into Japan Display) 
 Toshiba Matsushita Display Technology (Dissolved in 2009, bought by Toshiba)
 TOPWAY Display
 Truly Semiconductors
 Videocon
 Winstar display
 Yes Optoelectronics

OLED panel manufacturers 

Organic light emitting diode (or OLED displays) is a thin, flat panel made of glass or plastic used for electronically displaying information such as text, images, and moving pictures. OLED panels can also take the shape of a light panel, where red, green and blue light emitting materials are stacked to create a white light panel. OLED displays can also be made transparent and/or flexible and these transparent panels are available on the market and are widely used in smartphones with under-display optical fingerprint sensors. LCD and OLED displays are available in different shapes, the most prominent of which is a circular display, which is used in smartwatches. The list of OLED display manufacturers:

 AU Optronics
 BOE
 China Star Optoelectronics Technology (CSOT)
 Chunghwa Picture Tubes
 EverDisplay Optronics
 Futaba Corporation (former TDK)
 InnoLux Corporation
 LG Display
 JOLED
 Kyocera
 LXD Incorporated
 Newhaven Display
 Pioneer Corporation
 Planar Systems
 Royole
 Ritek (RiT Display)
 Samsung Display
 Sony
 Sharp Corporation
 Tianma
 Truly Semiconductors
 Visionox
 Wisechip

Below are some manufacturers that make OLED light panels:

 LG Display
 Lumiotec
 OLEDworks
 Osram
 Panasonic (former)
 Philips
 Pioneer (former)

MicroLED panel manufacturers 

MicroLED displays is an emerging flat-panel display technology consisting of arrays of microscopic LEDs forming the individual pixel elements. Like OLED, microLED offers infinite contrast ratio, but unlike OLED, microLED is immune to screen burn-in, and consumes less power while having higher light output, as it uses LEDs instead of organic electroluminescent materials, The list of MicroLED display manufacturers:

 Samsung
 Sony
 Konka
 BOE Technology
/Leyard-Epistar Joint venture
 Sony produces and sells commercial MicroLED displays called CLEDIS (Crystal-LED Integrated Displays, also called Canvas-LED) in small quantities. Samsung sells a luxury and commercial product called "The Wall", which consists of several microLED display modules tiled together, like in most video walls.

Below are some manufacturers that make MicroLED light panels:

 Ostendo Technologies, Inc.
 Luumii
 Plessey Semiconductors Ltd

LCD panel fabrication plants

This list lists current LCD fabrication facilities, former facilities are below this first table.
LCDs are made in a glass substrate. For OLED, the substrate can also be plastic. The size of the substrates are specified in generations, with each generation using a larger substrate. For example, a 4th generation substrate is larger in size than a 3rd generation substrate. A larger substrate allows for more panels to be cut from a single substrate, or for larger panels to be made, akin to increasing wafer sizes in the semiconductor industry.
Panel Inputs per month is how many substrates can a plant process per month.

Open

Former

OLED fabrication plants

Only actual plants are listed, former plants should be placed on a table below this one.

MicroLED fabrication plants

Only actual plants are listed, former plants should be placed on a table below this one.

See also

Liquid-crystal display (LCD)
TFT LCD
LED-backlit Display
Mini LED Display
Organic Light-Emitting Diode (OLED)
AMOLED
MicroLED

References

External links
  Animated tutorial of LCD technology by 3M
 History and Physical Properties of Liquid Crystals by Nobelprize.org
 Introduction to liquid crystals from the Liquid Crystal Technology Group, Oxford University
 electrical control panel manufacturer

Display technology
Liquid crystal displays
Flat panel display manufacturers